Alfredo Testoni (1856–1931) was an Italian playwright and poet known for his work in the Bolognese dialect. In 1888 he established his own company at the Teatro Contavalli in Bologna. Amongst his best known plays is Cardinal Lambertini, a 1905 work set in eighteenth century Bologna. A number of his works have been adapted for film and television.

References

Bibliography
 Farrell, Joseph & Puppa, Paolo  A History of Italian Theatre. Cambridge University Press, 2006.
 Goble, Alan. The Complete Index to Literary Sources in Film. Walter de Gruyter, 1999.

External links

1856 births
1931 deaths
Italian dramatists and playwrights
People from Bologna